Minter may refer to:

Places in the United States
Minter, Alabama, an unincorporated community
Minter Village, California, an unincorporated community
Minter City, Mississippi
Minter, Washington State, Hendersen Bay's northwest shore, Carr Inlet, southern Salish Sea

Other uses
Minter (surname)